Dafabet is an online betting site. The company was founded on 7 November 2004 and is headquartered in Makati, Philippines.

History 

Dafabet was founded on November 7, 2004, in Makati, Philippines under the subsidiary of the privately-owned company AsianBGE licensed by Cagayan Economic Zone Authority (CEZA) and regulated by First Cagayan Leisure and Resorts (FCLRC). The company operated first in Asian countries then later advertised its UK presence by sponsoring football clubs such as Bournemouth, Norwich City, Aston Villa, Blackburn Rovers, Sunderland FC, Burnley FC, Everton FC and Celtic FC. The company owns a remote UK license under AsianBGE (Isle of Man) Limited, managed and regulated by The Gambling Commission in Great Britain.

Services 

Dafabet features In-Play gaming for sports events such as FIFA World Cup, Barclays Premier League, National Basketball Association, US Open, and Ultimate Fighting Championship. It has a partnership with ONEworks to process customer data. Dafabet provides live streaming and broadcasting of sporting events on the internet in order for the players to ensure the right outcomes. Its gaming platform is provided by Playtech, a leading software provider for Dafabet's casino online games, poker, slots and arcade games.

Dafabet offers an online affiliate programme for website owners and advertisers, who can earn commissions by referring players to Dafabet’s betting platform.

Reception 
eGaming Review releases an annual list of the top 50 e-gaming operators in the world and after recognizing its growth and fulfilling a set potential, Dafabet made the top-half of the list at number 21 in 2013, the first time since it launched in 2004. In 2014, eGaming Review again announced their rankings of the top 50 e-gaming operators in the world and this time around, Dafabet landed in at number 19. In 2015, Dafabet managed to maintain brand presence in Europe although it went down in e-gaming top 50 and ended at 23rd.

Sponsorships 
Dafabet has partnered with athletes and commentators including footballer Alan Shearer, snooker player Jimmy White, and footballer Steve McManaman.

Among British football teams, it has partnered with Everton and West Bromwich Albion in 2012–2013; Aston Villa F.C. in 2013–2014 and 2014–2015; Celtic in 2016–2017 and five subsequent seasons; Burnley FC for 2016–2017; Sunderland FC for several years, ending in the 2017–2018 season; Fulham F.C for the 2018–2019 and 2019–2020 seasons; Norwich City F.C. for three seasons starting with 2019–2020; and AFC Bournemouth for two seasons starting with 2022-2023. Aston Villa, Celtic, and Fulham put Dafabet's logo on the front of the players' shirts.

In snooker, Dafabet was the principal sponsor of Players Tour Championship 2012/2013 – Finals, the 2014 World Snooker Championship, and the Masters from 2014 to 2020. 

In 2015, Dafabet became the lead sponsor of eSports team Fnatic, with their logo placed on the middle of player's shirts.

In 2020, Dafabet sponsored the cricket teams Durham and Sussex and the Liga team Cádiz CF

See also 
 Online gambling

References

External links 
 

Online gambling companies of the Philippines
Companies based in Makati
Gambling articles needing attention